Agylla metaxantha is a moth of the family Erebidae. It was described by George Hampson in 1895. It can be found in Bhutan.

References

Moths described in 1895
metaxantha
Moths of Asia